Mishukov, feminine: Mishukova is a Russian surname. Notable people with the surname include:

 Ivan Mishukov
 Bogdan Mishukov
 Oleg Mishukov
  (born 1979), Russian orientalist, vietnamologist and cultural activist

Russian-language surnames
ru:Мишуков